Myripistis aulacodes, the furrowed soldierfish, is a species of soldierfish from the genus Myripristis. It is endemic to Indonesia in the Western Pacific Ocean.

References

aulacodes
Fish of the Pacific Ocean
Taxa named by John Ernest Randall
Taxa named by David Wayne Greenfield